Cytoplasmic incompatibility (CI) is a phenomenon that results in sperm and eggs being unable to form viable offspring. The effect arises from changes in the gamete cells caused by intracellular parasites like Wolbachia, which infect a wide range of insect species. As the reproductive incompatibility is caused by bacteria that reside in the cytoplasm of the host cells, it is referred to as cytoplasmic incompatibility.  In 1971, Janice Yen and A. Ralph Barr of UCLA demonstrated the etiologic relationship of Wolbachia infection and cytoplasmic incompatibility in Culex mosquitos when they found that eggs were killed when the sperm of Wolbachia-infected males fertilized infection-free eggs.

Symptoms 

CI occurs when a Wolbachia infected male mates with a female that is infected by another Wolbachia strain (bidirectional CI) or is uninfected (unidirectional CI). 
Any other combination of un-/infected male/female crosses are compatible. An infected female is compatible with any uninfected male, or with any male infected with the same Wolbachia strain. On the other hand an uninfected female is only compatible with an uninfected male. In other words, if the male is infected by a CI-inducing strain of Wolbachia that is non-existent in its mate, it is an incompatible cross. Turelli et al 2018 finds that CI can be resolved by infection of the females with the same strain that is affecting the males, which imposes a population level incentive in favour of CI-inducing strains of Wolbachia. They also find that this propagates the WO phage. Hosts can be cured from Wolbachia infection by antibiotic use.

In diploid organisms CI leads to embryonic mortality. In contrast, CI in haplodiploid hosts may lead to haploid (and thus male) offspring. The closely related species of the wasp Nasonia show embryonic mortality as well as male development among incompatible crosses. In N. vitripennis, however, the vast majority of the CI embryos are converted into males.

Cellular mechanism 
There are two distinguished events that lead to the CI inducing manipulation.  The first occurs inside the Wolbachia infected male during spermatogenesis and is called modification. Because Wolbachia are absent from mature sperm and appear to be excluded during the individualization process, the modification must occur before the conclusion of spermatogenesis. 
The second event, called rescue, takes place inside the fertilized egg where Wolbachia presence prevents CI from occurring. As long as the Wolbachia strains in egg and sperm cells correspond, harmful effects cannot be observed on a cellular level.

A major consequence of CI is the delayed entry into mitosis of the male pronucleus. As a secondary consequence, stemming from this asynchrony,  the paternal chromosomes do not properly condense and align on the metaphase plate during the first mitosis. As a consequence, only the maternal chromosome segregate normally, producing haploid embryos. The rescue of CI by infected eggs leads to the restoration of synchrony between the female and the male pronucleus.

The exact mechanisms of how Wolbachia perform modification and rescue are unknown. In Drosophila, the earliest effects caused by CI can already be observed during the sperm chromatin remodeling of the paternal chromosomes. However, it was also observed that in other host species, the defects caused by CI only occur much later in development

Evolutionary implications 
CI, as described by Werren, results in selection pressure on uninfected males, as infected females can mate both with uninfected males and infected males, but uninfected females cannot mate with infected males. As Wolbachia are only transmitted by females, this mechanism promotes the spread of Wolbachia and therefore keeps Wolbachia from dying out because of incomplete transmission. This has led to discoveries in control of disease transmission by using Wolbachia to control the reproduction of a population by introducing Wolbachia-infected males. This has been seen in the Aedes, mosquito, family, in the Aedes albopictus and Aedes aegypti species.

Population genetics 
The infection of a population with CI-inducing Wolbachia can have different effects on the population's dynamics. At low prevalence of Wolbachia, the probability for an uninfected female to lose progeny because of mating with an infected male is fairly low.
This loss of uninfected individuals is outweighed by the loss of infection due to the incomplete Wolbachia transmission.
If the prevalence of CI-inducing Wolbachia is high enough, the probability for an uninfected female to mate with an infected male is high and it is thus preferable for a female to be infected. 
Therefore, there is an invasion threshold for the spread of Wolbachia in an uninfected population, which depends on the transmission rate of the infection and the portion of incompatible progeny which survive until they can reproduce (the strength of CI), as well as on the fitness cost of Wolbachia infection to the female.
Below this threshold the invaders will die out, above this threshold the prevalence will reach a stable equilibrium. Typical thresholds in real populations are around 10% (See Fine and Stouthamer et al.).

As described by Stouthamer, the invasion threshold may be crossed in two ways. 
In small populations, a small number of infected individuals is sufficient to reach the invasion threshold
In bigger populations, the division of the population into small subpopulations that only exchange a low number of individuals in each generation can lead to an invasion of this subpopulation.

Speciation
It is speculated that CI can lead to "rapid speciation". When two populations of the same species are infected by two Wolbachia strains A and B, they might be bidirectionally incompatible and crosses between the two populations do not lead to viable offspring. Thus gene flow between these two populations is interrupted, leading to constant segregation in development and, finally, to speciation. The populations develop to a point where incompatibility would be maintained even in absence of Wolbachia.

Other pathogens 
Wolbachia are not the only bacteria capable of inducing CI. For example, researchers have found that infection by bacteria of the genus Cardinium can also result in CI.

See also 
 Wolbachia
Cardinium
 Endosymbiont
 Intragenomic conflict

References 

Reproductive system